Adhyapak Abdul Majid College in Ramchandrapur, Muradnagar Upazila, Comilla, is a college in Bangladesh.

History Of Adhyapak Abdul Majid College 
Adhyapak Abdul Majid College was established in 1995 by Professor Abdul Majid, Chairman of the Popy Library. Majid established it in a rural area to reach underserved students. A new grading system was implemented at the college in 2003.

See also
List of Educational Institutions in Comilla

References

Colleges in Comilla District
1995 establishments in Bangladesh